Luke Cooper (born 28 July 1994) is an English professional rugby league footballer who plays as a prop or second row forward for Featherstone Rovers in the Betfred Championship.

Background
Cooper was born in Batley, West Yorkshire, England.

References

External links
Featherstone Rovers profile

1994 births
Living people
English rugby league players
Featherstone Rovers players
Rugby league players from Batley
Rugby league props
Rugby league second-rows